Kennard or variant, may refer to:

Places
 Loch Kennard, a lake in Perth and Kinross, Scotland, UK
 Kennard, Indiana, US
 Kennard, Nebraska, US
 Kennard, Ohio, US
 Kennard, Texas, US
 Kennard, Virginia, US

People
 Kennard (surname)
 Kennard baronets, of Fernhill in Southampton, England, UK
 Justice Kennard (disambiguation)
 Kennard Backman (born 1993), U.S. American-football player
 Kennard Baker Bork (born 1940), U.S. professor of geology and geography
 Kennard F. Bubier (1902–1983), member of the Byrd Antarctic Expedition
 Kennard Cox (born 1985), U.S. American-football player
 Kennard Wedgwood (1873–1949), a chinaware heir
 Kennard Winchester (born 1966), U.S. basketball player
 Daniel Kennard Sadler (1882–1960), U.S. judge and lawyer

Other uses 
 Kennard Street Park, Cleveland, Ohio, USA
 Kennard Independent School District, Kennard, Texas, USA
 Kennard High School, Kennard, Texas, USA
 Kennard-Dale High School, Fawngrove, York County, Pennsylvania, USA
 Nelson-Reardon-Kennard House, Abingdon, Harford, Maryland, USA
 Thomas P. Kennard House, Lincoln, Nebraska, USA
 Kennards, a UK department store

See also

 Kennards House, Cornwall, England, UK
 Kennard School (disambiguation)
 
 Kennar (disambiguation) (disambiguation)